Choe Yeong (Korean: 최영; 1316–1388), also romanized as Choi Young, was a Korean general born in Hongseong or Cheorwon during the Goryeo period. He became a national hero after he put down the Jo Il-shin (조일신) rebellion. He also participated in the Red Turban Rebellions and later allied with the Ming dynasty to overthrow the Mongol Yuan dynasty. In his final years, General Choe was betrayed and executed by his former subordinate Yi Seong-gye, who founded the Joseon dynasty of Korea, bringing an end to the Goryeo period.

Early years

Choe Yeong was born into the prestigious Cheolwon (more recently known as Dongju) Choe noble clan as the fifth descendant of Choe Yu-cheong, the Grand Scholar of Jiphyeonjeon, the Royal Academy, and the son of Choe Won-jik. He was raised in a strict austere lifestyle, befitting a noble aristocratic family of Goryeo. He paid little heed to what he wore and ate, and eschewed fine garments and other comforts even after becoming famous and successful. He disliked men who desired expensive articles, and he viewed simplicity as a virtue. Choe Yeong's motto, left to him by his father, was to regard gold as nothing but mere rocks.

Military career

Jo Il-shin and Japan 
Based on his character and beliefs, Choe Yeong was well-suited for the military. In the military, Choe Yeong quickly gained the confidence of both his men and the king due to numerous victories against Japanese pirates (Wokou) who began raiding the Korean coast around 1350.

In 1352, at the age of 36, Choe Yeong became a national hero after he successfully put down a rebellion by Jo Il-shin when insurgents surrounded the royal palace, killed many officials, and proclaimed Jo Il-shin as the new ruler.

Red Turban rebellions 
As Goryeo was a tributary, or "Bumaguk (son-in-law nation)", to the Mongol Yuan dynasty since 1259, Choe Yeong was sent to help the Yuan forces quash insurgents during the Red Turban Rebellion in northern China. In 1354, at the age of 39, he deployed to northern China with 2,000 Korean mounted archers, and was reinforced in Kanbaluk by 20,000 veterans of the Goryeo Tumens. Together they suppressed the Red Turban Rebellion and returned home to Goryeo. However, later the Yuan dynasty was overthrown by the uprisings of Zhu Yuanzhang, who founded the Ming dynasty, and Chen Youliang, who founded the Chen Han dynasty.

Choe Yeong's success in nearly 30 different battles won him even more fame and favor at home. Upon returning to Korea, he dutifully reported to Gongmin about the internal problems troubling the waning Yuan dynasty, which gave the king the idea that the time was opportune to reclaim some of the northern territories previously lost to the Mongols. General Choe fought to recover various towns west of the Yalu River to the great delight of Gongmin. In 1356, he attacked and received the surrender of the Mongol-Korean Darughachi of Ssangseong Chonggwanbu in what is now Wonsan, where the former Goryeo ruling aristocrats had surrendered their fiefdoms to the Mongols prior to Goryeo's national surrender of sovereignty in 1259. The surrendering darughachi of Ssangseong was none other than Yi Jachun, whose son, the deputy darhughachi, was Yi Seong-gye, the future founder of the Joseon dynasty.

In 1360, Choe Yeong defeated the Red Turbans during the Red Turban invasions of Goryeo.

Choe Yeong served briefly as the mayor of Pyongyang, where his efforts at increasing crop production and mitigating famine won him even more attention as a national hero. In 1364, he distinguished himself further when he defeated a powerful minister named Deok Heung-gun who tried to overthrow the government of Goryeo for asserting independence from the Yuan dynasty. Choe Yu, appointed by Empress Gi of Yuan, invaded Korea with 10,000 Mongol cavalry to overthrow the rebellious king, but Choe Yeong gathered up his forces and defeated the Mongol Tumen of 10,000, solidifying the final defiance and independence of Goryeo dynasty from the Mongols in 1364.

Yuan-Ming dynasties 
In 1368, when the new Ming dynasty of China offered an alliance against the Mongols, King Gongmin of Goryeo ordered Choe Yeong to invade the remaining Mongol garrisons in Manchuria. Choe Yeong maneuvered north of the Yalu River and captured  and the city of Liaoyang in 1370, but this did not lead to a permanent settlement.

Betrayal and redemption
Following a dream that he thought predicted that a Buddhist monk would save his life, King Gongmin promoted a monk named Shin Don to a lofty position within his court and allowed him considerable influence. At first, Shin Don toiled to improve the lives of the peasants despite great opposition from the ministers; however, with the king's support Shin Don grew increasingly ruthless and corrupt. Choe Yeong, who vigorously opposed corruption in the kingdom, found himself at odds with the monk, and subsequently, Shin Don engineered false accusations of misconduct against Choe Yeong that resulted in a punishment of six years in exile and brought him dangerously close to execution. However, after Shin Don's death in 1374, Gongmin restored Choe Yeong to his previous position and immediately asked him to prepare a fleet to fight Japanese pirates and eliminate the remaining Mongol forces on Jeju Island. Choe Yeong engaged the Mongols first, who fought tenaciously, but Choe's forces eventually freed the island. Then, in 1376, the Japanese pirates advanced into Goryeo and captured the city of Gongju. With the new gunpowder recipe obtained by scientist Choe Mu-seon, General Choe and his subordinate, Yi Seong-gye, routed and defeated the pirates, and reclaimed Gongju.

Final years
General Choe was betrayed and executed by his former subordinate Yi Seong-gye.

In 1388, General Yi Seong-gye was ordered to use his armies to push the Ming forces out of the Liaodong peninsula. Yi Seong-gye opposed the northern expedition, citing four reasons:
 A smaller nation should not attack a larger nation, as it goes against the Confucian order of the world
 It is harsh to campaign during the summer farming season, as it will result in a poor harvest for the populace
 With the bulk of the men away to the north, Japanese pirates will have free rein in the south
 Monsoon rains will reduce the effectiveness of composite bows, the army's main weapon, and will encourage the spread of infectious diseases in the camps.
General Choe ordered the invasion nevertheless, supported by the young King U. However, knowing the support he enjoyed from high-ranking government officials and the general populace, Yi Seong-gye decided to return to the capital, Gaegyeong, and trigger a coup d'état. This incident later became famous as the Wihwado Retreat and became the first sign of the change of dynasty.

When Yi Seong-gye returned to the capital, Choe Young put up a gallant defense at the palace, but was outnumbered and overwhelmed. General Choe was defeated, captured, and banished to Goyang and was later beheaded by Yi Seong-gye's government. Before the execution, Choe was famously known to have predicted that due to his unjust demise, grass would never grow on his grave. Grass did not grow on his grave until 1976 and it became known as Jeokbun (적분), which means red grave, because of the red soil.

Family
Father: Choi Won-jik (최원직, 崔元直)
Mother: Lady, of the Bongsan Ji clan (부인 봉산 지씨, 夫人 鳳山 智氏)
Wives and children:
Lady, of the Munhwa Ryu clan (부인 문화 류씨, 夫人 文化 柳氏)
Son: Choe Dam (최담, 崔潭)
Grandson: Choe Gwi-deok (최귀덕, 崔貴德)
Grandson: Choe Ju (최주)
Grandson: Choe Do (최도, 崔渡)
Grandson: Choe Sik (최식)
Grandson: Choe Eon (최언, 崔彦)
Daughter: Lady Choe (부인 최씨, 夫人 崔氏)
Son-in-law: Sa Gong-min (사공민, 司空敏)
Lady Eun (부인 은씨, 夫人 殷氏)
Daughter: Royal Consort Choe Yeong-bi (영비 최씨, 寧妃 崔氏)
Son-in-law: King U of Goryeo (1365 – 1389) (고려 우왕)

In popular culture
 Portrayed by Shin Goo in the 1983 KBS1 TV series Foundation of the Kingdom.
 Portrayed by Kim Gil-ho in the 1983 MBC TV series The King of Chudong Palace.
 Portrayed by Kim Sung-ok in the 1996-98 KBS1 TV series Tears of the Dragon.
 Portrayed by Choi Sang-hoon in the 2005-06 MBC TV series Shin Don.
 Portrayed by Lee Min-ho in the 2012 SBS TV series Faith.
 Portrayed by Son Byong-ho in the 2012-13 SBS TV series The Great Seer.
 Portrayed by Seo In-seok in the 2014 KBS1 TV series Jeong Do-jeon.
 Portrayed by Jeon Guk-hwan in the 2015-16 SBS TV series Six Flying Dragons.

See also
Goryeo
Yi Seonggye
King Gongmin
Jeong Mong-ju

References

External links
General Choi, Young Shrine at the Information Network Village

Korean generals
14th-century Korean people
1316 births
1388 deaths